Ranelagh is a township in the Huon Valley of Tasmania, Australia. A satellite town of Huonville, which it is adjacent to, it is a former agricultural area and now a tourist town and residence for workers who commute to other areas for work.

It is best known for the Ranelagh Showgrounds which host the annual Huon Show and Taste of the Huon events which are major tourism attractions for the Huon Valley.

Etymology
Ranelagh previously shared the name Victoria with neighbouring Huonville. Huonville was renamed in 1891 when it was gazetted as a town.

Features
Ranelagh is a semi-rural locality. The centre are Marguerite and Wilmot Streets. Marguerite St includes the Ranelagh Soldiers' Memorial Hall opened in 1924, Summer Kitchen Cafe, Ranelagh General Store and the Ranelagh Showgrounds on the corner of Marguerite and Ranelagh St.

Wilmot St holds the heritage-listed Clifton estate (previously Matilda's of Ranelagh) St Marys of the Cross Catholic Church and St James Anglican Church and respective cemeteries. Ranelagh also includes the Jimmy Watson Memorial Trophy winning Home Hill Winery and Huon Bush Retreats.

References

External links 

Towns in Tasmania
Southern Tasmania
Localities of Huon Valley Council